KTQ or ktq can refer to:

, a German healthcare accreditation organisation; see 
Katabangan language (iso-639-3: ktq), an extinct language of the Philippines
Kitee Airfield, Finland (IATA code: KTQ)
Kudra railway station, Bihar, India (station code: KTQ); see 
 The Library of Congress Classification for works related to law in Sudan; see

See also